The Bondelswarts are a Nama ethnic group of Southern Africa living in the extreme south of Namibia, in an area centred on the town of Warmbad.

History 
They rose up against German colonial rule in the Nama War 1903-1906. They were brutally repressed.

They inhabit an arid region around Fish River Canyon and the Richtersveld. 

In 1922 they were involved in the Bondelswarts Rebellion, a revolt against a tax on dogs, which was violently repressed.

References

Notes

Further reading
 
 John S. Lowry, Big Swords, Jesuits, and Bondelswarts, 2015.
 Brian Wood, Namibia 1884-1984: Readings on Namibia's History and Society, Namibia Support Committee, United Nations Institute for Namibia, 1988 
 Alfred T. Moleah, Namibia, the Struggle for Liberation, 1983
 Dean McCleland, John Dunn: Part 1 – Background to the Bondelswarts People & the SAC 

 
Ethnic groups in Namibia
ǁKaras Region